The Juno Award for Jazz Album of the Year - Group has been awarded since 2015, as recognition each year for the best jazz album of a group in Canada.

Winners

References 

Jazz Album of the Year - Group
Jazz awards
Awards established in 2015
2015 establishments in Canada
Album awards